V33, or similar, may refer to:
 Fokker V.33, a German World War I prototype fighter aircraft
 Focke-Wulf Fw 190C V33, a German fighter aircraft of World War II
 NEC V33, a microprocessor
 Open V33 Grand Lyon, a golf tournament played 1992–1994
 V.33, a modem recommendation of the ITU-T